Thomas Flath (born 13 November 1964) is a German football player and manager, who is head coach of Borussia Mönchengladbach U17.

Playing career
Flath was born in Düsseldorf. A Fortuna Düsseldorf youth product he retired in 1984 at the age of 20 after one season with the club's reserves. He played as a midfielder.

Coaching career
Flath began his coaching career as youth coach for Fortuna Düsseldorf and coach later the youth team from FC Schalke 04, later was Technical Director of the Asian Football Confederation.
Flath was on 28 April 2008 named as the head coach of Nepal national football team and coached the team between 30 June 2008. On 6 October 2009, was named as the new head coach of Hannover 96 II, replacing Andreas Bergmann who became the head coach of the Bundesliga team from Hannover 96.

References

External links
 Interview: Nepal Coach Thomas Flath

1964 births
Living people
German footballers
Association football midfielders
German football managers
FC Schalke 04 managers
Nepal national football team managers
German expatriate football managers
German expatriate sportspeople in Nepal
Expatriate football managers in Nepal
German expatriate sportspeople in Azerbaijan
Expatriate football managers in Azerbaijan
Footballers from Düsseldorf
West German footballers
West German football managers